The  are award ceremonies for the recognition of voice acting talent for outstanding performance in anime and other media in Japan. The first Seiyu Awards were held on March 3, 2007 at the 3D Theatre of the Tokyo Anime Center in Akihabara.

Awards ceremonies

Awards
Seiyu Award for Best Actor in a Leading Role
Seiyu Award for Best Actress in a Leading Role
Seiyu Award for Best Actors in Supporting Roles
Seiyu Award for Best Actresses in Supporting Roles
Seiyu Award for Best Rookie Actress
Seiyu Award for Best Rookie Actor

See also
 List of animation awards

References

External links
  

 
2007 establishments in Japan
Anime awards
Anime industry
Awards established in 2007